The Nyika climbing mouse (Dendromus nyikae) is a species of rodent in the family Nesomyidae.
It is found in Angola, Democratic Republic of the Congo, Malawi, Mozambique, South Africa, Tanzania, Zambia, and Zimbabwe.
Its natural habitat is moist savanna.

References
 Chitaukali, W. 2004.  Dendromus nyikae.   2006 IUCN Red List of Threatened Species.   Downloaded on 19 July 2007.
Musser, G. G. and M. D. Carleton. 2005. Superfamily Muroidea. pp. 894–1531 in Mammal Species of the World a Taxonomic and Geographic Reference. D. E. Wilson and D. M. Reeder eds. Johns Hopkins University Press, Baltimore.

Dendromus
Rodents of Africa
Mammals described in 1909
Taxonomy articles created by Polbot